Ronald Lee Bradford (born October 1, 1970) is a former defensive back who played for the NFL's Denver Broncos (1993–1995), Arizona Cardinals (1996), Atlanta Falcons (1997–2001) and Minnesota Vikings. He also served as a defensive assistant coach for the Broncos and Kansas City Chiefs. Bradford was also the defensive backs coach at USC.

Early years
Bradford was born in Minot North Dakota. Bradford played high school football at Adams City High School in Commerce City, Colorado.

College career
Ronnie Bradford played college football for the University of Colorado. During his sophomore year, he blocked an extra point in Colorado's 10-9 victory over Notre Dame in the 1991 Orange Bowl to help Colorado win a share of the National Championship in the 1990 college football season (Colorado shared the National Championship in 1990 with Georgia Tech). That blocked extra point by Bradford was the difference in that football game.

Professional career
Bradford finished his ten NFL seasons with two sacks, four fumble recoveries, and 13 interceptions, one of which he returned for a touchdown.  With the Falcons, he played in Super Bowl XXXIII and recorded an interception from Broncos quarterback John Elway in the game.

Coaching career
Bradford spent six seasons (2003–2008) with the Denver Broncos coaching on defense and special teams. He was a defensive assistant with the Kansas City Chiefs in 2009. Bradford joined California's coaching staff in March 2010 as an administrative assistant for the defense. The move reunited Bradford with former Kansas City defensive coordinator. In September 2011, he was added to the U of Memphis football staff as a secondary coach. In 2013, he coached at Louisiana Tech University. In 2016, he was hired by USC to coach the defensive secondary.

References

External links
Cal bio
Kansas City Chiefs bio

1970 births
Living people
Sportspeople from Minot, North Dakota
Players of American football from North Dakota
American football defensive backs
Colorado Buffaloes football players
Denver Broncos players
Arizona Cardinals players
Atlanta Falcons players
Minnesota Vikings players
Denver Broncos coaches
Kansas City Chiefs coaches
People from Commerce City, Colorado